"Jerusalem" is third single from Alphaville's album Afternoons in Utopia. It is their seventh single overall, although it was only made available in Germany. It was released in November 1986.

Song development
In the liner notes for 1992's First Harvest 1984–92, band member Ricky Echollette had this to say about the song:

The song was recorded and mixed at Studio 54, Berlin, in September 1985.

Reviews
Overall, the song "Jerusalem" has been universally well received by critics. It was described as "the secret highlight" of the album (Afternoons in Utopia), "with a wonderful chorus and an inspiring, just epic enough atmosphere." Another reviewer acknowledges that this song "is one of the most beautiful songs Alphaville has ever created." A third reviewer writes that it "reside(s) in the upper echelon of early-'80s synth pop" (alongside fellow album track and subsequent single "Red Rose").

Track listings
 7" single
 "Jerusalem (7" Version)" – 3:45
 "Vingt mille lieues sous les mers incl. The Nelson Highrise Sector 3: The Garage" – 5:00

 12" single
 "Jerusalem (The Palace-Version)" – 6:17
 "Jerusalem" – 4:21
 "Vingt mille lieues sous les mers incl. The Nelson Highrise Sector 3: The Garage" – 5:00

 The 4:21 version of "Jerusalem" on the 12" is not given a name. It is the LP version, but does not fade at the end, instead lasting about 10 seconds longer than how it appears on the LP, and ends in a cold cut
 "Vingt mille lieues sous les mers" is French for "20,000 leagues under the sea"
 The B-side also appears on the subsequent single, "Sensations," and a remix appears on 1999's Dreamscapes
 The original "Palace Version" and the unaltered b-side appear for the first time on CD on 2014's so80s presents Alphaville

The Nelson Highrise Sectors
This single contains the third of 4 songs that Alphaville have designated a "Nelson Highrise Sector:"
 The Nelson Highrise Sector 1 is "The Elevator," the B-side to 1984's single, "Sounds Like a Melody"
 The Nelson Highrise Sector 2 is "The Other Side of U," the B-side to 1986's single "Dance With Me"
 The Nelson Highrise Sector 4 is "The Scum of the Earth," from 2003's CrazyShow

Charts
The song hit #57 in Germany, the only region in which the single was officially released.

Other releases
This song was released on a variety of other official Alphaville releases, including:
 First Harvest 1984-92, 1992 (7" version)
 Dreamscapes, 1999 (demo remix and live version)
 Stark Naked and Absolutely Live, 2000 (live version)
 Forever Pop, 2001 (remixes)
 Little America, 2001 (live version)

Notes

Alphaville (band) songs
1986 singles
Songs written by Marian Gold
Songs written by Ricky Echolette
Songs written by Bernhard Lloyd
Atlantic Records singles
Warner Music Group singles
1986 songs
Songs about Jerusalem